The Kadoorie family or "Khedouri" are a wealthy Hong Kong-based family, originally Mizrahi Jews from Baghdad, Iraq. From the mid-18th century they were established in Mumbai, British Raj India becoming one of the wealthiest families in Asia; their businesses were subsequently centered in Shanghai from the mid-19th century, and then in Hong Kong from 20th century onwards.

Family members
The Kadoorie family includes a number of notable individuals:
 Sir Ellis Kadoorie (1865–1922), philanthropist and businessman
 Sir Elly Kadoorie (1867–1944), philanthropist and businessman
Lawrence Kadoorie, Baron Kadoorie, CBE  (1899–1993) was a famous industrialist, hotelier, and philanthropist in Hong Kong.
  Rita Laura McAulay, married Ronald McAulay
 Andrew McAulay (b. 1967)
 Sir Michael Kadoorie (b. 1941), businessman and philanthropist
 Bettina Kadoorie
 Natalie Louise Kadoorie (b. 1986)
 Philip Lawrence Kadoorie (b. 1992)
 Victor Kadoorie (1900-1900)
 Sir Horace Kadoorie (1902–1995), industrialist, hotelier, and philanthropist
Rosa Kadoorie was married to American adventurer Hilaire du Berrier.

Philanthropy
Kadoorie family has donated, in the 1990s, 500,000 USD for the construction of the new Shanghai Museum.

In 1961, in times of drought in Hong Kong, Mr. Kadoorie donated cement and pipes and the Yim Tin Tsai villagers contributed money and effort and laid the water mains that deliver water from Mud Bay to Yim Tin Tsai island. From then on, the villagers had access to freshwater supply instead of drawing water from wells.

Enterprises 
Enterprises founded by the family:
CLP Group
Hongkong and Shanghai Hotels
The Peninsula Hotels

See also
 Kadoorie Agricultural High School
 Khodori Institute, Tulkarm
 Kadoorie Farm and Botanic Garden
 Shanghai ghetto

References

 
Surnames
Jewish families
Iraqi Jews
People from Baghdad
Iraqi families
Hong Kong Jews
Chinese Jews
Baghdadi Jews